The Cebu City Council (Filipino: Sangguniang Panlungsod ng Cebu) is the legislature of Cebu City, Philippines. The legislative body is composed of 18 councilors, with 16 councilors elected from Cebu City's two councilor districts and two elected from the ranks of barangay (neighborhood) chairmen and the Sangguniang Kabataan (youth councils). The council's presiding officer is the vice-mayor (elected by the city). The council is responsible for creating laws and ordinances under the jurisdiction of Cebu City. Although the mayor can veto proposed bills, the council can override the veto with a two-thirds supermajority.

History
In 1937, four municipalities (including Cebu) were officially converted into cities. With the largest population and number of registered voters at the time, Cebu City was allocated eight members for its city council. On February 24, 1937, at the promulgation of the Cebu City charter, the eight inaugural members of the council were sworn in: Jose P. Nolasco, Dominador Abella, Diego Cañizares, Leandro Tojong, Manuel Roa, Felipe Pacaña, Regino Mercado and Jose Fortich.

On December 10, 1940, eight members were elected to the council: Leandro A. Tojong, Juan Zamora, Honorato S. Hermosisima, Florencio Urot, Florentino D. Tecson, Ramon U. Abellanosa,  Cecilio dela Victoria, and Numeriano Estenzo. Their election was confirmed in Executive Order No. 315, s. 1940, signed on December 28, 1940, by President Manuel Quezon.

The post-war city council was convened on July 1, 1945, and was composed of Honorato S. Hermosisima, Cecilio dela Victoria, Florencio S. Urot, Numeriano G. Estenzo, Eugenio G. Corro, Canuto O. Borromeo, Alfonso S. Frias and Miguel Sanson. On July 5, 1945, Cebu City Ordinance No. 1, "An Ordinance regulating the establishment and maintenance of cockpits in the City of Cebu", was passed; the city's first ordinance, it was also the first cockpit ordinance in the Philippines and was authored by Councilor Cecilio dela Victoria. Another ordinance was Cebu City Ordinance No. 4, "An Ordinance Appropriating Funds for the necessary expenses of the Government of the City of Cebu during the period from July first Nineteen Hundred Forty-Five to September Thirtieth Nineteen Hundred Forty-Five, and for other purposes".

Seat

The council sits at Cebu City Hall, meeting in the Doña Eva Macaraeg-Macapagal Session Hall of the Cebu City Legislative Building (CCLB). The renovated CCLB was inaugurated on July 24, 2008, by President Gloria Macapagal Arroyo, assisted by Cebu City Mayor Tomas Osmeña and Vice Mayor Michael Rama. The building cost  to renovate,  of which came from the Philippine Tourism Authority (now TIEZA).

The hall was named for Eva Macaraeg-Macapagal, the mother of former president Gloria Macapagal Arroyo and the second wife of former president Diosdado Macapagal.

During its September 3, 2019, session, the city council approved an ordinance institutionalizing the conduct of regular and special sessions outside of its current session hall. These sessions would also be aired live on the official Facebook page of the Cebu City's Public Information Office (PIO).

Membership
Each of Cebu City's two councilor districts elects eight members of the council. In plurality-at-large voting, a voter may vote for up to eight candidates and the candidates with the eight highest numbers of votes are elected. Barangay and SK chairs throughout the city each elect a representative to the council, for a total of 18 councilors. City council elections are synchronized with other elections in the country, which have been held on the second Monday of May every third year since 1992.

Blocs

As of July 6, 2022, the council is divided into two blocs: the majority bloc and the minority bloc. The majority bloc is composed primarily of councilors who won under BARUG-PDP-Laban and the minority bloc is composed mainly of councilors who won under BOPK-LDP.

Twelve of the council's 16 generally-elected seats were won by BARUG councilors in the 2022 elections while the remaining four seats were won by BOPK councilors.

2022-2025 membership

Notes

Definition of simple majority
In an omnibus resolution, Majority Floor Leader James Anthony Cuenco and the BARUG Team Rama council members moved to declare all positions in the Council vacant (including the presiding officer pro tempore, majority floor leader, 1st assistant majority floor leader, 2nd assistant majority floor leader and the chairs and members of all standing and ad hoc committees) on June 20, 2017. This was in response to the change in affiliation of BARUG Team Rama councilors David Tumulak, Nendell Hanz Abella and Jerry Guardo to BOPK, making it the council's majority bloc. For several weeks, no committee chairs were elected because of disagreements about what constituted a simple majority. The presiding officer, Vice Mayor Edgardo Labella, met with Councilors Margarita Osmeña and James Anthony Cuenco and they agreed to seek the opinion of the Department of the Interior and Local Government (DILG).

A July 24, 2017, DILG opinion stated that the City Council presiding officer should not be included in the count determining the council's majority bloc, citing the August 3, 2016 Supreme Court ruling in Tobias Javier vs. Rhodora Cadiao, et al.: "The Vice Governor, as the Presiding Officer, shall be considered a part of the SP for purposes of ascertaining if a quorum exists. In determining the number which constitutes as the majority vote, the Vice Governor is excluded. The Vice Governor's right to vote is merely contingent and arises only when there is a tie to break." The vice governor is the presiding officer of a provincial board, and the vice mayor is the presiding officer of a city (or municipal) council.

Officers

Powers, duties, and functions
The council, as the city's legislative body, is mandated by the Local Government Code of 1991 to enact ordinances; approve resolutions; appropriate funds for the welfare of the city and its inhabitants (pursuant to Section 16 of the Local Government Code), and ensure the proper exercise of the city's corporate powers (as provided under Section 22 of the Local Government Code). It has the following duties and functions:
Approving ordinances and passing resolutions necessary for an efficient and effective city government;
Generating and maximizing the use of resources and revenue for the city's development plans, program objectives and priorities as provided for under Section 18 of the Local Government Code, with particular attention to agricultural and industrial development and citywide growth and progress;
Enacting ordinances granting franchises and authorizing the issuance of permits or licenses, subject to Book II of the Local Government Code;
Regulating activities related to land use, buildings, and other structures in the city to promote the general welfare of its inhabitants;
Approving ordinances which ensure the efficient delivery of basic services and facilities as provided under Section 17 of the Local Government Code; and
Exercising other powers and performing other duties and functions as prescribed by law.

Committees

2022–present 
There are currently 27 standing committees as of July 6, 2022:

2020–2022 
New officers were elected on July 29, 2020. Ad hoc committees for the Cebu City Medical Center and for the online session were also created.

2019–2020 
There were 26 standing committees as of July 14, 2019:

Past councils

2019-2022
Majority of the councilors in the 15th council came from BARUG.

 Michael Rama (presiding officer; assumed by Donaldo Hontiveros on November 20, 2021)
 Nestor Archival
 James Anthony Cuenco
 Alvin Dizon
 Eugenio Gabuya Jr.
 Raymond Alvin Garcia
 Joel Garganera
 Jerry Guardo
 Donaldo Hontiveros
 Lea Ouano-Japson
 Prisca Niña Mabatid
 Renato Osmeña Jr.
 Jocelyn Pesquera
 Eduardo Rama Jr.
 David Tumulak
 Joy Augustus Young
 Phillip Zafra
 Franklyn Ong (LNB)
 Jessica Resch (SK)

2016-2019

Sixty-seven ordinances and over 4,600 resolutions were passed by the 14th council from 2016 to 2019. Eugenio Gabuya, Jr. had the largest number of approved ordinances of the 18 city legislators, and Margarita Osmeña had the largest number of approved resolutions. Sisinio Andales had perfect attendance during the council's 116 regular sessions.

 Edgardo Labella (presiding officer)
 Alvin Arcilla
 Mary Ann De Los Santos
 Sisinio Andales
 Joy Augustus Young
 Jerry Guardo
 Raymond Alvin Garcia
 Pastor Alcover Jr.
 Joel Garganera
 David Tumulak
 Margarita Osmeña
 Eduardo Rama Jr.
 Jose Daluz III
 Nendell Hanz Abella (replaced by Renato Osmeña, Jr. after his appointment to the NLRC)
 Eugenio Gabuya Jr.
 James Anthony Cuenco (replaced by Erik Miguel Espina after his dismissal from service)
 Jocelyn Pesquera
 Phillip Zafra (LNB)

2013-2016
On May 17, 2016, the Department of the Interior and Local Government (DILG) served a six-month preventive suspension order against Cebu City Mayor Michael Rama, Vice Mayor Edgardo Labella and 12 councilors for "grave abuse of authority." They allegedly received a ₱20,000 calamity fund, although they had not suffered in Super Typhoon Yolanda and the magnitude 7.2 earthquake which struck Cebu in 2013. Not included in the suspension order were Councilors Margarita Osmeña, Lea Ouano-Japson, Richard Osmeña, James Anthony Cuenco and Philip Zafra. Osmeña temporarily served as acting mayor and Japson as acting vice-mayor until June 30, 2016.

 Edgardo Labella (presiding officer; assumed by Lea Ouano-Japson on May 17, 2016)
 Nestor Archival
 Mary Ann De Los Santos
 Alvin Arcilla
 Sisinio Andales
 Lea Ouano-Japson
 Alvin Dizon
 Ma. Nida Cabrera
 Noel Eleuterio Wenceslao
 Margarita Osmeña
 Gerardo Carillo
 Eugenio Gabuya Jr.
 David Tumulak
 Roberto Cabarrubias
 James Anthony Cuenco
 Nendell Hanz Abella
 Richard Osmeña
 Phillip Zafra (LNB)
 John Philip Po II (SK)

2010-2013
The 12th council conducted its first regular offsite sessions in Barangays Bonbon, Guba and Luz on October 12 and 26, 2011 and August 15, 2012, respectively. The council went paperless on July 20, 2011, with councilors using their laptops (their own or issued by the city) for the regular session; this maintained the city's environmentally-friendly stance and saved money.

Notable ordinances passed by the council included City Ordinances No. 2339, which prohibited discrimination in the city on the basis of disability, age, health status, sexual orientation, gender identity, ethnicity or religion; No. 2343, which phased out single-use plastic products in the city and No. 2326, giving the elderly and people with disabilities free parking in malls, hospitals and other establishments.

 Joy Augustus Young (presiding officer)
 Edgardo Labella
 Augustus Pe Jr.
 Alvin Arcilla
 Sisinio Andales
 Lea Ouano-Japson
 Alvin Dizon
 Noel Eleuterio Wenceslao
 Ma. Nida Cabrera
 Rodrigo Abellanosa
 Margarita Osmeña
 Eduardo Rama Jr.
 Jose Daluz III
 Raul Alcoseba
 Ronald Cuenco
 Richard Osmeña
 Roberto Cabarrubias
 Michael Ralota (LNB)
 John Philip Po II (SK)

2007-2010

The 11th council received two Local Legislative Awards in the Highly Urbanized or Independent Component Cities category for the substance of enacted legislation, efficiency of its records staff, completeness of the Agenda, Journals, and Minutes Division and the availability of facilities and amenities in the session hall.

 Michael Rama (presiding officer)
 Hilario Davide III
 Nestor Archival
 Edgardo Labella
 Sylvan Jakosalem
 Christopher Alix 
 Edwin Jagmoc
 Lea Ouano-Japson
 Augustus Pe Jr.
 Rodrigo Abellanosa
 Raul Alcoseba
 Gerardo Carillo
 Jose Daluz III
 Arsenio Pacaña
 Eduardo Rama Jr.
 Richard Osmeña
 Roberto Cabarrubias
 Eugenio Faelnar Jr. (LNB)
 Rengelle Pelayo (SK)

2004-2007

 Michael Rama (presiding officer)
 Hilario Davide III
 Nestor Archival
 Sylvan Jakosalem
 Edgardo Labella
 Christopher Alix
 Gabriel Leyson
 Edwin Jagmoc
 Augustus Pe Jr.
 Rodrigo Abellanosa
 Eduardo Rama Jr.
 Gerardo Carillo
 Arsenio Pacaña
 Jocelyn Pesquera
 Procopio Fernandez
 Raul Alcoseba
 Jose Daluz III
 Eugenio Faelnar Jr. (LNB)
 Glena Bontuyan (SK)

2001-2004

 Michael Rama (presiding officer)
 Nestor Archival
 Christopher Alix 
 Carmelita Piramide
 Danilo Fernan
 Sylvan Jakosalem
 Dana Ruiz Sesante
 Vicente Kintanar Jr.
 Manuel Legaspi
 Jocelyn Pesquera
 Procopio Fernandez
 Eugenio Gabuya Jr.
 Gerardo Carillo
 Arsenio Pacaña
 George Rama
 Gabriel Leyson
 Jose Navarro (LNB until 2002)
 Eugenio Faelnar Jr. (LNB 2002–2004)
 Glena Bontuyan (SK)

1998-2001
City Ordinance No. 1726, establishing the Cebu City Commission for the Welfare and Protection of Children, was passed by this council.

 Renato Osmeña (presiding officer)
 Franklin Seno
 Michael Rama
 Rogelio Osmeña
 Ronald Cuenco
 Firmo Dayao
 Ernesto Elizondo
 Rodolfo Estella
 Procopio Fernandez
 Eugenio Gabuya Jr.
 Edgardo Labella
 Manuel Legaspi
 Laurito Malinao
 Ananias Ouano
 Jocelyn Pesquera
 Felixberto Rosito
 Fe Mantua-Ruiz
 Jose Navarro (LNB)
 Anthony Jones Luy (SK)

1995-1998
City Ordinance No. 1656, revising the city's comprehensive zoning regulations, was passed by this council.

 Renato Osmeña (presiding officer)
 Rodolfo Cabrera
 Jessie Aznar
 Ruben de la Cerna
 Eleno Abellana
 Christopher Alix
 Manuel Concepcion
 Ronald Cuenco
 Rico Rey Francis Holganza
 Gabriel Leyson
 Laurito Malinao
 Rogelio Osmeña
 Arnulfo Ravina
 Felixberto Rosito
 Fe Mantua-Ruiz
 Joy Augustus Young
 Michael Rama
 Ananias Ouano (LNB)
 Anthony Jones Luy (SK)

See also
Sangguniang Panlungsod
Manila City Council
Zamboanga City Council

References

External links
City Government of Cebu

City councils in the Philippines
Politics of Cebu City
Local government in Cebu City